Lightburn Hospital is a health facility in Carntyne Road, Glasgow, Scotland. It is managed by NHS Greater Glasgow and Clyde.

History
The facility (located just off the A8 Edinburgh Road in the east end of the city) has its origins in the old Lightburn Infectious Diseases Hospital which was designed by James Thomson and completed in 1896. It joined the National Health Service in 1948. The infectious diseases hospital closed in 1964 and was replaced by a new 120‑bed geriatric unit. The new unit was extended in 1972 and in 1977. A proposal from the health board to close the hospital was rejected by the Scottish Government in January 2018; a similar plan was halted in 2011.

References

Hospitals in Glasgow
1896 establishments in Scotland
Hospitals established in 1896
Elderly care
NHS Greater Glasgow and Clyde
NHS Scotland hospitals